Tuuliin Tom Tunuud FC is a Mongolian association football club currently competing in the  Mongolia Second League. As of 2022, the club also fields a women's side that plays in the Women's National Football League, the top tier female league in the country.

References

External links
Eleven Sports channel

Football clubs in Mongolia